Room Full of Mirrors: A Biography of Jimi Hendrix is a 2005 biography of the influential rock guitarist, singer, and songwriter Jimi Hendrix. It was written by Charles R. Cross. The name comes from the title of a Hendrix composition.

Room Full of Mirrors was released during the 35th anniversary of Hendrix's death and is composed of many interviews that Cross conducted.  More than half of the people interviewed had never spoken about Jimi since his death.

2005 non-fiction books
American biographies
Biographies about musicians
Biographies about African-American people
Jimi Hendrix
Sceptre (imprint) books